Couvet was a municipality in the district of Val-de-Travers in the canton of Neuchâtel in Switzerland. On 1 January 2009, the former municipalities of Boveresse, Buttes, Couvet, Fleurier, Les Bayards, Môtiers, Noiraigue, Saint-Sulpice and Travers merged to form the administrative district of Val-de-Travers.

It is claimed that Couvet was the birthplace of absinthe at the end of the 18th century and it is now the home of La Clandestine Absinthe. It was also the home to Edouard Dubied & Co, a factory that used to make sewing machines.

Personalities
 Emerich de Vattel, 18th century political philosopher
 Denis de Rougemont, 20th century author

References

External links
 
 Official website 
 Swiss absinthe site

Former municipalities of the canton of Neuchâtel